is a light gun shooting game developed by Ecole. It was released in arcades in 2000 then ported to the Dreamcast console in 2001 (published by Sammy Entertainment), several months after Sega had dropped support for the console. It is the third game in the Death Crimson series, and the only one to be released outside Japan.

Gameplay 

The game can be played with either a standard controller or a light gun.

Development 

Death Crimson OX was developed by Ecole Software.

Reception 

The Dreamcast version received "generally unfavourable reviews" according to the review aggregation website Metacritic. GameSpot described it as a second-rate House of the Dead clone. IGN cited a confusing storyline, poor visuals, and new gameplay mechanics which prevent the game from offering any sort of challenge. Game Informer said that it "gives you plenty of targets, but no real reason to keep pulling the trigger." Eric Bratcher of NextGen called it "A typical gun game with typical gun game problems: It's too short, too redundant, and too similar to everything else out there. Only the NRA would lobby for this one." In Japan, Famitsu gave it a score of 25 out of 40.

Also in Japan, Game Machine listed the arcade version in their 1 January 2001 issue as the thirteenth most-popular dedicated arcade game of the year 2000.

Notes

References

External links 
 
 

2000 video games
Arcade video games
Dreamcast games
Dystopian video games
Light gun games
PlayStation 2 games
Sega arcade games
Sega video games
Video games featuring female protagonists
Video games set in 2010
Video games developed in Japan